Pool Paradise is a 2004 pocket billiards video game, developed by Awesome Developments, and published by Ignition Entertainment, released for Microsoft Windows, PlayStation 2, and GameCube. The game is the fourth game to be endorsed by professional snooker and pool player Jimmy White.

Gameplay
Players control a virtual pool player at a beach resort, with pool tables inside different huts. Players have to work their way up the tournament ladder in order to unlock features and complete the game.

The game's features, according to Booners Interactive, include 30 unique computer characters, with highly detailed hands, on an animated island with day and night cycles, and 8 virtual camera modes; 11 different game types and 5 modes of play, with 10 different tournament ladders, and 10 table sizes and shapes; and analog cueing, using a gamepad or a mouse. "Hidden features" throughout the game were also alluded to. As well as various pool and snooker games, beach darts, a coconut shy, skee-ball ramp, and the original Dropzone arcade game are all unlockable. Unlike previous games endorsed by Jimmy White, in Pool Paradise, White is a playable character, and is the best player in game.

International edition

The game was re-released in 2006 under the new title Pool Paradise: International Edition, only in Europe for the PlayStation 2.

Reception

The game received "generally favourable reviews" on all platforms according to the review aggregation website Metacritic. Alex Trickett of BBC Sport called the game "crisp, clean fun at a budget price"; however, he did call the game's soundtrack "uninspired". Alex Navarro of GameSpot enjoyed the European GameCube version months before it was released, stating in an early review, "Pool Paradise features a great gameplay design, as well as a ton of available pool games and side ventures." He also suggested the game was very strong on its own merits commenting "even if Pool Paradise weren't the only available pool game for the GameCube, it would still be a strong choice for any billiards fan." GameSpot later named it the best GameCube game of April 2004, and nominated it for the year-end "Best Alternative Sports Game" award. GameSpy and Game Informer gave the same European GameCube version a mixed review, two months before it was released in Europe, and nearly three months before it was released Stateside.

References

External links
 

2004 video games
Cancelled Xbox games
Cue sports video games
GameCube games
PlayStation 2 games
Video games developed in the United Kingdom
Windows games
Video games set on islands
UTV Ignition Games games
Multiplayer and single-player video games